is a railway station located in the city of Ichinoseki, Iwate Prefecture, Japan, operated by the East Japan Railway Company (JR East).

Lines
Surisawa Station is served by the Ōfunato Line, and is located 30.6 rail kilometers from the terminus of the line at Ichinoseki Station.

Station layout
The station has a two opposed side platforms connected to the station building by a footbridge. The station has a Midori no Madoguchi staffed ticket office.

Platforms

History
Surisawa Station opened on July 26, 1925. The station was absorbed into the JR East network upon the privatization of the Japan National Railways (JNR) on April 1, 1987.

Passenger statistics
In fiscal 2018, the  station was used by an average of 241 passengers daily (boarding passengers only).

Surrounding area
 
 
Oguro Waterfall
Surisawa Park

See also
 List of Railway Stations in Japan

References

External links

  

Railway stations in Iwate Prefecture
Ōfunato Line
Railway stations in Japan opened in 1925
Ichinoseki, Iwate
Stations of East Japan Railway Company